The following is a list of winners of the Golden Arena for Best Screenplay at the Pula Film Festival.

List of winners
The following is a list of winners of the Golden Arena for Best Screenplay at the Pula Film Festival.

Yugoslav competition (1955–1990)

Croatian competition (1992–present)

References

External links

Pula Film Festival
Screenwriting awards for film
Awards established in 1955
1955 establishments in Yugoslavia